The Canadians can refer to:

 The Canadians (1959 film), a short film produced by the Canadian government to encourage immigration
 The Canadians (1961 film), a 1961 Western film starring Robert Ryan
 The Canadians (TV series), a 1998 documentary series featuring biographical depictions of famous Canadians.

It may also mean:
 The Canadian, a transcontinental Canadian rail line.
 A plural for the inhabitants of Canada